The Institute of Astrophysics of Andalusia (IAA-CSIC) is a research institute funded by the High Council of Scientific Research of the Spanish government Consejo Superior de Investigaciones Científicas (CSIC), and is located in Granada, Andalusia, Spain. IAA activities are related to research in the field of astrophysics, and instrument development both for ground-based telescopes and for space missions. Scientific research at the Institute covers the Solar System, star formation, stellar structure and evolution, galaxy formation and evolution and cosmology. The IAA was created as a CSIC research institute in July 1975. Presently, the IAA operates the Sierra Nevada Observatory, and (jointly with the also the Max-Planck Institute of Heidelberg) the Calar Alto Observatory.

The Instituto de Astrofísica de Andalucía is divided in the following departments, each with an (incomplete) outline of research avenues and groups:
 Department of Extragalactic Astronomy
 Violent Stellar Formation Group
 AMIGA Group (Analysis of the interstellar Medium of Isolated Galaxies)
 Department of Stellar Physics
 Department of Radio Astronomy and Galactic Structure
 Stellar Systems Group
 Department of Solar System

The technological needs of IAA's research groups are fulfilled by the Instrumental and Technological Developments Unit.

See also 
 BOOTES
 Instituto de Astrofísica de Canarias
 Josefa Masegosa Gallego, astronomer, scientific researcher

External links 
 Instituto de Astrofísica de Andalucía, 
 Consejo Superior de Investigaciones Científicas, 
 Sierra Nevada Observatory, 
 Calar Alto Observatory, 

Astrophysics
Astronomy organizations
Granada